The Valencia Half Marathon is an annual half marathon road running event held in Valencia, Spain, since 1988.  It is categorized as a Gold Label Road Race by World Athletics.  The race is organised by the Valencian sports club , which also organises the annual Valencia Marathon.

The race attracts top level elite competitors from Kenya, Ethiopia and Morocco, as well as runners from the host country Spain.

History 

From 1993 to 1995, the race was not contested for reasons beyond the organizer's control.

The race was later lengthened to a half marathon, beginning with the 2006 edition of the race.  The change coincided with a growth in the number of participants and a higher standard of elite level competition. A record 9328 runners from over 10,300 entrants finished the race in October 2013.

On , the race organizer announced the cancellation of the 2020 in-person edition of the race due to the coronavirus pandemic, with all registrants given the option of transferring their entry to 2021 or obtaining a full refund. On the day of the race, four half marathon runners broke the previous world record of 58:01, with Kenyan Kibiwott Kandie setting a new world record of 57:32.

Course 

Winners 

The course records for the half marathon are 57:32 for the men's race (set by Kibiwott Kandie in 2020) and 64:51 minutes for the women's race (also a world record at the time, set by Joyciline Jepkosgei in 2017).  The latter time is the women's all-comers record for the event in Spain.

Key: Course record (in bold)

20K

Half marathon

Notes

References

External links
Official website

Half marathons
Marathons in Spain
Sports competitions in Valencia
Recurring sporting events established in 1991
1991 establishments in Spain
Autumn events in Spain